Clinton School District is a public school district located in Clinton, Missouri. The district educates about 1,900 students in Pre-kindergarten through grade 12.

Schools

References

External links

Education in Henry County, Missouri
School districts in Missouri